Robert J. Cox (born December 4, 1933) also known as Bob Cox, is a British journalist who became editor and publisher of the Buenos Aires Herald, an English-language daily newspaper in Argentina. Cox became famous for his criticism of the military dictatorship (1976–1983). He was detained and jailed, then released after a day. During this time, he received multiple threats against his family. When one of the threats included very detailed information about his then 13-year-old son, he desisted from his work; the family left Argentina in 1979. He moved to Charleston, South Carolina, where he became an editor of The Post and Courier, owned by the same publishing company that owned the Buenos Aires Herald. In 2005, the Buenos Aires legislature recognized Cox for his valor during the dictatorship.

Biography 
Robert Cox arrived in Argentina in 1959, and was soon hired as a copy editor by the Buenos Aires Herald, the English-language newspaper of Argentina's English-speaking community. He later married Maud Daverio, an Argentine national. His influence in the newspaper was vast, having them change their design and reach, from a small community-oriented newspaper, to a respected national daily. He was promoted to publisher in 1968. Under his direction, the newspaper moved in 1975 to a building with printing plant at 455 Azopardo Street, which remained the newspaper's offices for 34 years.

Cox had married into a wealthy family, and lived a privileged life; his social circle included elite families and military figures. Initially, he sympathised with the junta because of social connections, threats from the leftist guerrillas, and an expected end to repression of Isabel Perón's government. But he and his newspaper reported clearly and often on the dirty war's atrocities, and editorialised about them, despite the junta's prohibitions.

At his initiative, the Buenos Aires Herald was the first media outlet in Argentina to report that the de facto government was kidnapping people and making them "disappear". As a reporter, Cox went to the public meetings by the Mothers of the Plaza de Mayo and, also personally checked that the military authorities were using the crematories at the Chacarita Cemetery to incinerate the bodies of the "disappeared".

Cox was detained in 1977:

From that moment, Cox and his family lived in a permanent state of danger, suffering an attempt on his life, and his wife a failed attempt at kidnapping. When the threat of murder was imminent, he left the country. The decision was taken when one of his sons, Peter, received the following note, crudely simulating a note from the Montoneros guerilla group:

Cox and family left. He held a Nieman fellowship at Harvard in 1980. They settled themselves in Charleston as mentioned above, working for a sister publication as editor of the international section, covering news like the civil wars in El Salvador and Nicaragua.

In 2005 the Legislatura of the city of Buenos Aires after the initiative of the vice-chief of the Cabinet, Dr. Raúl Alberto Puy, paid homage to Robert Cox as a journalist during the years of the military dictatorship. Cox received the prize "in the name of the journalists that disappeared".

In 2005, his wife, Maud Daverio de Cox wrote a book about his life in Argentina during the years of the military dictatorship titled "Salvados del infierno" ("Saved from Hell").

In 2008, his son David wrote a book about his father's experiences in this period in Argentina titled "Dirty Secrets, Dirty War: The Exile of Robert J. Cox"

In 2010, Cox was designated "an Illustrious Citizen of the Autonomous City of Buenos Aires" in recognition of his humanitarian work.

In 2016, "Messenger On A White Horse" Documentary film by Jayson McNamara at BAFICI. This documentary examines Robert Cox's (editor of Buenos Aires Herald) role in the unmasking of the 1970s Argentinian military dictatorship's assassinations of the "disappeared".

In 2017, written in Buenos Aires Times.

References 

1933 births
Living people
Journalists from Kingston upon Hull
English male journalists
People of the Dirty War
Argentine human rights activists
Maria Moors Cabot Prize winners
Nieman Fellows
People from Buenos Aires
Writers from Charleston, South Carolina
Prisoners and detainees of Argentina
English people imprisoned abroad
Officers of the Order of the British Empire
Journalists from South Carolina
Illustrious Citizens of Buenos Aires